Rowen Muscat (born 5 June 1991) is a Maltese international footballer who plays for Valletta as a midfielder.

Club career 

Muscat began his career with Birkirkara, moving to Hungarian club Dunaújváros. After returning to Birkirkara, he moved to Italian club Pavia on loan in January 2016. He signed for Valletta in January 2017, with Henry Bonello making the move in the opposite direction.

International career 
He made his international debut for Malta in the 1–0 win against Liechtenstein played on 14 November 2012. He scored his first goal on 14 October 2018, in a 1–1 draw against Azerbaijan.

International goals
Scores and results list Malta's goal tally first.

References 

1991 births
Living people
Maltese footballers
Malta international footballers
Birkirkara F.C. players
Dunaújváros PASE players
F.C. Pavia players
Valletta F.C. players
Maltese Premier League players
Nemzeti Bajnokság I players
Serie C players
Association football midfielders
Maltese expatriate footballers
Expatriate footballers in Hungary
Maltese expatriate sportspeople in Hungary
Expatriate footballers in Italy
Maltese expatriate sportspeople in Italy
People from Birkirkara